A Whole Nother Radio Active Thang is a compilation album by Clarence "Fuzzy" Haskins. The album was released in 1994 by Westbound Records and combines two individual albums recorded by Haskins, A Whole Nother Thang (1976), and Radio Active (1978), as well as a previously unreleased track titled "Right Back Where I Started From".

Track listing
"Tangerine Green" (Clarence Haskins)
"Cookie Jar" (Haskins)
"Mr. Junk Man" (Haskins)
"I Can See Myself in You" (Haskins)
"Fuz and da Boog" (Haskins, Cordell Mosson)
"Which Way Do I Disco?" (Haskins)
"Love's Now Is Forever" (Haskins)
"Sometimes I Rock and Roll" (Haskins)
"I'll Be Loving You" (Haskins)
"Not Yet" (Haskins)
"I Think I Got My Thang Together" (Haskins)
"This Situation Called Love" (Glenn Goins)
"Gimme Back (Some of the Love You Got from Me)" (Haskins)
"Things We Used to Do" (Haskins)
"Woman" (Haskins)
"Sinderilla" (Haskins)
"Silent Day" (Haskins, Mosson)
"Right Back Where I Started From" (Haskins) – previously unreleased track

Fuzzy Haskins albums
1994 compilation albums